Spleak was an IM platform where users could publish and rate content. It existed in the form of six bots covering as many subject areas: CelebSpleak, SportSpleak, VoteSpleak, TVSpleak, GameSpleak, and StyleSpleak.

Overview

Users can add a "multi-Spleak" (which contains all of the different Spleak bots in one) to their IM buddy lists on MSN (spleak@hotmail.com) and AIM (buddy name: spleak), or add the separate bots on MSN (celeb@spleak.com, sport@spleak.com, vote@spleak.com, tv@spleak.com, game@spleak.com, and style@spleak.com) or AIM (buddy name: celebspleak, sportspleak, votespleak, tvspleak, gamespleak, and stylespleak). Users are also allowed access to Spleak online by using a CelebSpleak, SportSpleak, or VoteSpleak widget, or through the CelebSpleak and SportSpleak applications with Facebook.

Spleak was an alternate reality game and is moving to its own company, Spleak Media Network. "Celebrate Spleak" was introduced throughout 2007, launched in 2008, and was forced to retire in 2009.

Key people

Spleak was co-founded by Morten Lund and Nicolaj Reffstrup. The company's chief executive officer is Morrie Eisenburg; Josh Scott is Vice President in Product and Tyler Wells is Vice President in Engineering.

See also
lonelygirl15
SmarterChild

References
 Mashable.com article on Hearst partnership
 FastCompany article on Spleak widget
 eMediaWire article on new Spleak interactive communities
 Venturebeat profile on IMT Labs

Chatbots
Meta Platforms applications